Syracuse Stars may refer to:

In baseball:
Syracuse Stars (National League), 1877–1879 (1879 in the NL)
Syracuse Stars (American Association), 1885–1890 (1890 in the AA)
Syracuse Stars (minor league baseball), various minor league teams which played between 1877 and 1929

In ice hockey:
Syracuse Stars (amateur hockey), 1996–2010, a Junior A team in the Eastern Junior Hockey League
Syracuse Stars (ice hockey), a minor-league professional ice hockey team from 1930–1940

Ω
Ω
Ω